Barwidgee (formerly known as Barwidgee Creek) is a rural locality in northeast Victoria, Australia. The nearest town to Barwidgee is Myrtleford about 5.44 km away. Barwidgee is within Alpine Shire.

Barwidgee Creek Post Office opened on 1 March 1912 and closed in 1957.

Barwidgee  was affected by the Black Saturday bushfires, with some deaths in the region and many homes lost.

References

	

Towns in Victoria (Australia)
Alpine Shire